Genthin was a Verwaltungsgemeinschaft ("collective municipality") in the Jerichower Land district, in Saxony-Anhalt, Germany. It was disbanded in July 2009. The seat of the Verwaltungsgemeinschaft was in Genthin.

The Verwaltungsgemeinschaft Genthin consisted of the following municipalities:

 Genthin
 Gladau
 Paplitz 
 Tucheim

References

Former Verwaltungsgemeinschaften in Saxony-Anhalt